Christopher Hewetson (c.1737–1798) was a neoclassical sculptor of portrait busts. Born in Ireland, he was active in Rome.

Biography
Hewetson was born in Thomastown, County Kilkenny, Ireland, in 1737/8 the son of Lieutenant Christopher Hewetson whose ancestry was from Yorkshire. His father died in 1744 when Christopher was only 7, leaving his mother Eleanor with four young children to raise.

He studied at Kilkenny College, where his uncle the Rev. Dr Thomas Hewetson was headmaster,  and in Dublin under John van Nost the younger.

In 1765 he arrived in Rome with the American painter Henry Benbridge.  He remained in Rome for the remainder of his life with the exception of two brief visits to Naples in 1766 and 1797.

With the assistance of Thomas Jenkins, Hewetson received commissions from numerous British and Irishmen visiting Rome on the Grand Tour. He also sculpted busts of a number of local churchmen. Antonio Canova was at Rome during part of Hewetson's stay. The rivalry between the two sculptors emerged in two great commissions, the Tomb for Pope Clemens XIV and the Tomb for Pope Clemens XIII, both won by Canova.
In the last phase of his career Hewetson held a two-sided production: he sculpted copies after the Antique - sometimes in marble, more often in plaster - as well as portrait-busts. His workshop was in Via San Sebastianello, very close to Piazza di Spagna.
Hewetson never married. He died at Rome in 1798, where he was buried in the Protestant Cemetery. His inventory after death, recently found, revealed the presence of 12 busts, some left unfinished, and of a considerable number of copies after the antique.

Works

Charles Towneley (marble bust, 1769), Department of Medieval & Modern Europe, British Museum,
Sir Watkin Williams-Wynn, 4th Baronet (bust, 1769), National Gallery of Ireland, Dublin
Pope Clement XIV (marble busts, two in 1772, one in 1776), several almost identical copies which at various times have been in Ammerdown (Somerset); Gorhambury (Herts); Beningbrough Hall (Yorks); Penrice and Margam castles, near Swansea; the Victoria and Albert Museum, London, and  the Center of British Art of Yale University (New Haven, USA)
Thomas Mansel Talbot (marble bust, 1773), Victoria and Albert Museum, London
Thomas Mansel Talbot (chalk bust), Museo Civico, Bassano del Grappa, Italy.
Luigi III Gonzaga: it:Luigi III Gonzaga (marble bust, 1776), Museo di Roma in Palazzo Braschi, Rome
Maria Maddalena Morelli :it:Maria Maddalena Morelli (bust, 1776), Museo di Roma in Palazzo Braschi, Rome
Frederick Hervey, 4th Earl of Bristol (marble bust, c. 1778), National Portrait Gallery, London
Sir Thomas Gascoigne, 8th Baronet of Parlington (bronze bust, c. 1778), Victoria and Albert Museum, London
Martha Swinburne (marble medallion in funerary monument, 1779), Chiesa di San Tommaso, Rome
Unknown Gentleman-Robert Adams (c. 1780), Fine Arts Museums of San Francisco
José Nicolás de Azara (bronze bust, c. 1780), Institut de France, Paris
José Nicolás de Azara (marble bust, 1781), Protomoteca Capitolina, Rome
Anton Raphael Mengs (marble bust, 1781), Protomoteca Capitolina, Rome
Gavin Hamilton (bust, 1784), University Art Collection, Glasgow
Thomas Brereton-Westfaling, 1740 - 1814 (c. 1785), The Louvre, Paris
Richard Baldwin (marble monument, 1784), Examination Hall, Trinity College, Dublin
Cardinal Giovanni Battista Rezzonico (marble monument, 1787), Chiesa di San Nicola in Carcere, Rome
Gottfried Leibniz (bust, 1787 - 1790), Reception hall of the Technologie Centrum, Hannover
Anton Raphael Mengs (bronze bust cast by Francesco Righetti, 1792), Clark Art Institute, Williamstown, Massachusetts
Count Anton Günther of Oldenburg (bust, white marble, 1794, part of the Count's monument), vestibule of St. Lambert Church, Oldenburg, Germany.
Giovanni Pichler (marble bust, 1797), Museo Capitolino, Rome
Thomas Westfaling (bust), St Mary, Ross-on-Wye, Herefordshire, U.K.
Mr and Mrs Henry Swinburne (bust), Gascoigne bequest at Lotherton Hall, Leeds
Alcyone and Ceyx (relief), Gascoigne bequest at Lotherton Hall, Leeds

Bibliography
 P. Coen, "Christopher Hewetson: nuovi documenti, nuove interpretazioni" (i.e. C.H.: new documents, new interpretations), in Bollettino d'Arte, 97, 2012, pp. 87–100.
Ulrich Thieme – F. Becker, "Hewetson Cristopher", Allgemeines Lexikon der Bildenden Kunstler, (Leipzig, 1924), vol. XVII, p. 13.
C. Pietrangeli, a cura di G. Incisa della Rocchetta, Vincenzo Monti a Roma, exhibition catalogue, Rome, Palazzo Braschi, Roma, 1955, pp. 47, 50, tav. VII.
V. Martinelli, C. Pietrangeli, La Protomoteca Capitolina, Roma, 1955, pp. 8, 36, 73, 78, tavv. VIII e 2.
Barnes, J. "An unknown bust by Chrisopher Hewetson", Antologia di Belle Arti, s.s., 52-55, 1996, pp. 166–169.
Breffny, B., and C. Hewetson. "Christopher Hewetson (1737-1798), Irish sculptor". Irish Arts Review, III(3), 52-75.
Hodgkinson, Terence. "Christopher Hewetson: An Irish Sculptor in Rome", Walpole Society 34 (1952-1954): 42-54 at 50 and pl. XVIIIc
Anne Crookshank in Brian de Breffny, ed., The Irish World: The Art and Culture of the Irish People, (New York, 1977) 146, 147, and 170.
Brian de Breffny, ed., Ireland: A Cultural Encyclopaedia, (London, 1983) 105 - 106.
Id., "Christopher Hewetson, Concise Biography and Preliminary Catalogue Raisonné", Irish Arts Review 3 (1986): 52 - 75, no. 17a
Bowren, E.P., and J.J. Rischel. Art in Rome in the Eighteenth Century (Philadelphia and Houston,  2000), 228-230, 254-255.
Esdaile, K.A. "Christopher Hewetson and his monument to Dr. Baldwin in Trinity College, Dublin", Journal of the Royal Society of Antiquaries of Ireland (December 1947): 134-135.

References

1737 births
1798 deaths
Irish sculptors
People from Thomastown
People educated at Kilkenny College